Dolphin Cove (also called Dolphin Point at SeaWorld San Diego) is a SeaWorld attraction, which can be found at two SeaWorld parks and holds about  of water. Specifically, Dolphin Cove is located at SeaWorld Orlando and SeaWorld San Diego.

Dolphin Cove was designed to reflect a natural ecosystem and has an underwater viewing area where visitors can watch the dolphins while listening to relaxing music, and hear the dolphin's communications.

The Dolphin Cove habitat is one of the largest dolphin pools in existence, where the visitor can interact with the dolphins. It features  waves, a sandy beach and an imitation coral reef. The organisation Ric O'Barry Dolphin Project tries to raise awareness of this attraction.

History

When founded in 1964, SeaWorld San Diego was the first of its kind to feature a Dolphin Cove. In 1970, the second park SeaWorld Ohio was built in Aurora, Ohio, near Cleveland; it featured a Dolphin Cove. In 1973, the third Dolphin Cove opened together with SeaWorld Orlando. In 1988, the fourth Dolphin Cove in SeaWorld San Antonio opened its doors. 

In January 2001, SeaWorld Ohio was sold to Six Flags resulting in the exhibit's closure. On March 6, 2015, SeaWorld San Antonio announced that the park would have a new dolphin habitat and hub for three of its animal interaction programs with dolphins, beluga whales and California sea lions called Discovery Point. The announcement of the project was followed by Dolphin Cove's closure on March 23, 2015. Discovery Point officially opened to the public on May 21, 2016. The project has doubled the size of the previous dolphin pool and added an underwater viewing area.

Dolphins

Dolphin Cove mainly consists of bottlenose dolphins, one of the most common dolphins. The dolphins are shifted between Dolphin Cove, Dolphin Nursery and Discovery Cove; depending on pregnancies and space availability.

Bottlenose dolphins can be found worldwide, in warm waters such as the Gulf of Mexico.

Throughout the day, visitors can feed the dolphins for a fee. Trainers give informational speeches about the bottlenose dolphin. All of the dolphins at dolphin cove have names, some being Jenever, C.J, Alpha, Calla, Naia, Griffith, Sparrow, Rascal, Dexter, Sasha, Tasha, and Tinker
.

Criticism
Organizations such as World Animal Protection and the Whale and Dolphin Conservation Society are against the captivity of dolphins and orcas. Bottlenose dolphins might not have a shorter life span in captivity (like orcas) but cannot make much use of echolocation due to sensory deprivation. Small pools and the chlorination of the water are living conditions marked for criticism.

SeaWorld's methods for obtaining animals in the past have also been criticized. SeaWorld's attempt to capture several killer whales in Puget Sound in the early 1970s using powerboats, airplanes and explosives to drive the animals resulted in revoking of all capture permits. Dolphin captures ended in the late 1980s. In 1995, SeaWorld announced that it would no longer capture dolphins and whales from the wild. The animals are now obtained through breeding including artificial insemination, loans, and purchases from other marine parks around the world.

References

External links

Official SeaWorld website
SeaWorld at WikiAttractions
Captive Dolphin Database
National Marine Fisheries Service - Application for a Permit for Public Display under the Marine Mammal Protection Act
United States Department of Commerce - National Oceanic and Atmospheric Administration: Review of Public Display Permit Application

Oceanaria in the United States
Tourist attractions in San Diego
SeaWorld Orlando
SeaWorld San Antonio
SeaWorld San Diego
Dolphinariums

de:SeaWorld
fr:SeaWorld
pt:SeaWorld
sv:SeaWorld